Sarvelayat may refer to:
 Sarvelayat District
 Sarvelayat Rural District